Studio City is a neighborhood in Los Angeles.

Studio City may also refer to:
 Studio City (Macau), a hotel and casino resort on Macau's Cotai area
 Studio City (album), by Brad Laner/Electric Company
 Studio City Sound, a recording studio